Thomas Gamble Pitcher (October 23, 1824 – October 21, 1895) was a career American soldier who served as the Superintendent of the United States Military Academy from 1866 until 1870.

Pitcher was born at Rockport, Indiana, a son of Judge John Pitcher, who loaned his law books to young Abraham Lincoln. He graduated from West Point in 1845.  During the Mexican War, he won the brevet rank of first lieutenant. He was promoted to captain in 1858.

During the Civil War, Pitcher participated in the defense of Harpers Ferry in June 1862, where he and his men were among the thousands of Union soldiers who surrendered to Stonewall Jackson. After being released and exchanged, he served in the Virginia campaign until the battle of Cedar Mountain (August 9, 1862), where he was severely wounded. He was then brevetted major in the regular army, and three months later was commissioned brigadier general of volunteers, but saw no further active service. On March 13, 1865, he was brevetted lieutenant colonel, colonel, and brigadier general in the regular army.

On July 28, 1866, Pitcher was commissioned as the colonel of the 44th U.S. Infantry. From 1866 to 1870 he was superintendent of the United States Military Academy, and from 1870 until 1877 was superintendent of the New York Soldiers and Sailors Home.

He died of tuberculosis on October 21, 1895 and is buried in Arlington National Cemetery, along with his sons, Lt. Col. John Pitcher (also a West Point graduate, class of 1876) and Col. William L. Pitcher.

See also

 List of American Civil War generals (Union)

References

External links
 
 Judge John Pitcher - Lincoln Connection

People of Indiana in the American Civil War
Union Army generals
People from Rockport, Indiana
United States Military Academy alumni
American military personnel of the Mexican–American War
Members of the Aztec Club of 1847
Superintendents of the United States Military Academy
Burials at Arlington National Cemetery
1824 births
1895 deaths